The Distomo Archaeological Collection is a museum in Distomo, in Boeotia, Central Greece. The museum, noted for its pottery collection, was established in 1994 and is supervised by the Tenth Ephorate of Prehistoric and Classical Antiquities.

History
The idea of a museum began in 1987 when the local council donated an old stone primary school erected in 1903 to the Greek Ministry of Culture, which began renovating and restoring the building.

Collection
The museums contain a notable pottery collection from Medeon and Antikyra. It has a number of vases unearthed ancient Medeon. The vases from Antikyra date between the 8th and 2nd centuries BC. One of the notable artifacts is a clay sima. It was discovered in a  building in Antikyra and is dated to the 4th century BC.

References

External links
Hellenic Ministry of Culture and Sports
Greek travel directory

Distomon
Museums established in 1994
Boeotia
1994 establishments in Greece